The Mudaito dynasty (Modaytó dynasty) is the ruling dynasty of the Sultanate of Aussa (Sultanate of Awsa) in Ethiopia. It was founded by the Asaihemara Modaito clan of the Afars who came from the La'o and Doobi areas.

History

The Sultanate of Aussa (Afar Sultanate) succeeded the earlier Imamate of Aussa. The latter polity had come into existence in 1577, when Muhammed Jasa moved his capital from Harar to Aussa (Asaita) with the split of the Adal Sultanate into Aussa and Sultanate of Harar. At some point after 1672, Aussa declined and temporarily came to an end in conjunction with Imam Umar Din bin Adam's recorded ascension to the throne. On 26 September 1725, the Mudaito Afars and their Harla allies invaded Aussa from the North-east Eli Da'ar and central-west of Andhar Kalu and burnt the state of Awsa. They began Modaito expansion through Dobi and Kalo by ransacking Adali settlements. The following month they defeated Imam Salman's soldiers, killing 200 Imamate soldiers. By 1734, Kedafo prevailed as Amoyta over the imamate and established the Mudaito dynasty. The primary symbol of the sultan was a silver baton, which was considered to have magical properties.

In June 1764, the Mudaito extended their area of control by overpowering Imamate tribes in and around Awsa. In July 1809, Amir Mahammad bin A'as Ali confronted the Mudaito to avenge his father's killing in Awsa but failed. In the following years, The Mudaito unleashed heavy blows against the pro-Imamate warriors of Adali Debne We'ima when the powerful Adals tried to halt Mudaito advance. In 1814, the Mudaito invaded Tadjourah, the capital of Adali Dardars, killing Adali rulers and destroying homes. This shaped the power struggle in Afar history in favour of Mudaito's rule which allowed the expansion of Mudaito's Awsa Sultanate lasting up until the colonial reorganisation in 1936.

Rulers
The following is a list of Mudaito dynasty rulers (Amoyta).

See also
Sultanate of the Geledi
Sultanate of Ifat
Isaaq Sultanate
Walashma dynasty

Notes

References
Encyclopaedia Aethiopica, vol. 1, article on Afar literature
Didier Morin, Dictionnaire historique des Afar, 2003

Afar people
History of Ethiopia
Sultanates
Lists of monarchs
1734 establishments in the Ethiopian Empire
Sunni dynasties